In addition to their own state flags and anthems, each 13 of Malaysia's states has its own emblems, consisting of a state animal and a state plant.

See also
 List of Malaysian flags
 List of Malaysian coats of arms

States of Malaysia

References